Te’e Masaniai Jr. is an American Samoan politician and United States military retiree, Vietnam War veteran and Purple Heart recipient.

Masaniai was a candidate for Lieutenant Governor of American Samoa in the 2008 gubernatorial election, as the running mate of gubernatorial candidate Tuika Tuika. The ticket received just 0.51 per cent of the popular vote.

Early life
Masaniai served in the United States Army 1966-1968 and the United States Marines Corps 1968–1972. He served in Vietnam in the Vietnam War in 1966-1967 and 1969–1970.

See also
2008 American Samoa gubernatorial election

References

External links
 Samoa News political advertisement for Tukia for Governor, Nonpartisan candidates

Year of birth missing (living people)
Living people
American Samoan politicians
United States Army personnel of the Vietnam War
United States Marine Corps personnel of the Vietnam War
United States Army soldiers
United States Marines